Nassarius macrodon is a species of sea snail, a marine gastropod mollusc in the family Nassariidae, the Nassa mud snails or dog whelks. It only occurs as a fossil.

There is one subspecies: Nassarius macrodon recidivus (Martens, 1876)

Description

Distribution

References

 Gofas, S.; Le Renard, J.; Bouchet, P. (2001). Mollusca, in: Costello, M.J. et al. (Ed.) (2001). European register of marine species: a check-list of the marine species in Europe and a bibliography of guides to their identification. Collection Patrimoines Naturels, 50: pp. 180–213

Nassariidae
Gastropods described in 1831